Qalāti Ghilzay, also called Qalāti Zābul or Qalāti Khaljī, or simply Qalāt or Kalat, is a city in southern Afghanistan and the capital of Zabul Province. It is linked by Highway 1 with Kandahar to the southwest and Ghazni and Kabul to the northeast. The population of the town are ethnic Pashtuns, mostly from the Ghilji tribe, after whom the city is named.

The total population of Qalati Ghilji is 49,158 (2015). The city has 4 police districts (nahias) with a total land area of 4,820 Hectares and 5,462 total number of dwellings.

Qalati Ghilji is a Provincial Centre located in southern Afghanistan. Barren land is the dominant land use classification 59% of total land. While built-up land use only accounts for 19% of total land use, within that classification there is a large proportion of institutional land (33%). Qalati Ghilji also has two distinct industrial areas in Districts 2 and 3.

In 2006, Zabul's first airport was built near Qalat. Qalat became home to the U.S.-led Provincial Reconstruction Team Zabul, which began assisting in development projects and building governance throughout the province.

On 13 August 2021, Qalati Ghilji was seized by Taliban fighters, becoming the seventeenth provincial capital to be captured as part of wider 2021 Taliban offensive.

Other names
Qalati Ghilji has been known as Qalāt-i Khaljī, Qalāt-i Tokhī, or simply Qalāt or Kalāt.

History 

In medieval times, the area was within the heartland of the Khalaj tribe. The Khalji dynasty of India originated from this city. Many of the Khalaj were Pashtunized, transforming into the Ghilji tribe of Pashtuns.

A political mission came through the city April 16, 1857, en route to Kandahar to broker a new treaty of friendship between the British government at Peshawar and the Amir of Kabul.  The party was greeted by a group sent out by the heir-apparent to welcome them and check on the party's supplies.  Two companies of infantry were formed so the British could inspect the troops.  Afterwards, a shura was held.

Sher Ali Khan captured the city on January 22, 1867.  In the battle, he lost a son, Mahomed Ali, killed in single combat by his uncle.  His uncle was subsequently killed.

Climate
Qalati Ghilji features a semi-arid climate (BSk) under the Köppen climate classification. The average temperature in Qalat is 13.6 °C, while the annual precipitation averages 283 mm.

July is the hottest month of the year with an average temperature of 27.5 °C. The coldest month January has an average temperature of -2.9 °C.

American reconstruction efforts 
In an effort to bring economic development to the area, Zabul province's first airstrip was built just outside the city in 2006.  It is a dirt runway.  The first flight brought in supplies for Provincial Reconstruction Team Zabul and other organizations trying to rebuild the area.  Three years later, a girls school was built to attempt to improve education in the area.  An initial school supply and prayer mat donation was made, and regular book drops and school supply donations were made until the PRT left in 2013.  Clean water programs around the city improved the availability of clean water sources.  In 2009, efforts were completed to improve the water system at the old Qalat City Hospital to bring clean drinking water to patients there.

Not all the reconstruction efforts were successful, however.  In 2006, construction began on a new economic district for the city.  Meant to be an area of commerce and development, ten million dollars and three years later, most of the buildings are unoccupied, unusable either due to lack of the skills to maintain the buildings or due to a lack of need for the building.  Zabul province's governor refused to move into the new house, citing the lack of security.

Anne Smedinghoff, a 25-year-old U.S. diplomat, was killed by a suicide car inside the city in the spring of 2013.

Notable sites
The local skyline is dominated by a fortress constructed by the forces of Alexander the Great (see: Qalat (fortress)).
Ghar Bolan Baba, a 730m deep cave historically used for religious purposes

References 

Forts in Afghanistan
Populated places in Zabul Province
Provincial capitals in Afghanistan